Tateshina may refer to
Tateshina, Nagano a town in Japan
Mount Tateshina, a volcano in Japan
11149 Tateshina, a minor planet named after the volcano